Youssef Bouguerra (born 28 October 1969) is an Algerian wrestler. He competed at the 1992 Summer Olympics and the 1996 Summer Olympics.

References

External links
 

1969 births
Living people
Algerian male sport wrestlers
Olympic wrestlers of Algeria
Wrestlers at the 1992 Summer Olympics
Wrestlers at the 1996 Summer Olympics
Place of birth missing (living people)
21st-century Algerian people
20th-century Algerian people